Volnoye-Syrishchevo is a rural locality (a village) in Komyanskoye Rural Settlement, Gryazovetsky District, Vologda Oblast, Russia. The population was 4 as of 2002.

Geography 
Volnoye-Syrishchevo is located 39 km northeast of Gryazovets (the district's administrative centre) by road. Nekhotovo is the nearest locality. nearest lake Maurinsko  with 4 village Maurino and mount Maura in region connecting with a line form a bracket

References 

Rural localities in Gryazovetsky District